Vietnamophryne (common name: Indochinese dwarf frogs; Vietnamese: nhái lùn; Thai: ueng tham khrae) is a divergent genus of Asterophryinae frogs found in Indochina. Its closest relative is the genus Siamophryne. The genus Vietnamophryne was first described by Poyarkov, et al. (2018).

Species
There are three species, described in 2018:
Vietnamophryne inexpectata Poyarkov, Suwannapoom, Pawangkhanant, Aksornneam, Duong, Korost, and Che, 2018
Vietnamophryne orlovi Poyarkov, Suwannapoom, Pawangkhanant, Aksornneam, Duong, Korost, and Che, 2018
Vietnamophryne occidentalis Poyarkov, Suwannapoom, Pawangkhanant, Aksornneam, Duong, Korost, and Che, 2018
In 2021 the descriptions of two species were added:
Vietnamophryne cuongi Nguyen, Hoang, Jiang, Orlov, Ninh, Nguyen, Nguyen, and Ziegler, 2021
Vietnamophryne vuquangensis Hoang, Jiang, Nguyen, Orlov, Le, Nguyen, Nguyen, Nguyen, Nguyen, and Ziegler, 2021

Type localities
Type localities of each species:
Vietnamophryne cuongi in Ba Vi National Park, Hanoi, northern Vietnam,
Vietnamophryne inexpectata in Kon Chu Rang Nature Reserve, Gia Lai Province, central Vietnam.
Vietnamophryne orlovi in Phia Oac-Phia Den National Park, Cao Bang Province, northern Vietnam.
Vietnamophryne occidentalis in Doi Tung Mountain, Chiang Rai Province, northern Thailand.
Vietnamophryne vuquangensis in Vu Quang National Park, Ha Tinh Province, Vietnam near to the Laos border.

References

 
Amphibians of Vietnam
Amphibians of Thailand
Amphibian genera